Cornus was an ancient Punic-Roman town of Sardinia near Cuglieri and the location, during the revolt of Hampsicora, of a battle between a Sardinian army and the Roman Republic. The  Carthaginians were also involved fighting against the Romans. The town is now unoccupied and is an archaeological site with a large well temple complex still visible.

References

External links 

 

Archaeological sites in Sardinia